Trichobolus is a genus of fungi in the Thelebolaceae family.

Species

The genus Trichobolus contains six species:

 Trichobolus dextrinoideosetosus 
 Trichobolus octosporus 
 Trichobolus pilosus 
 Trichobolus sphaerosporus'' 
 Trichobolus vanbrummelenii 
 Trichobolus zukalii''

References

External links
Index Fungorum

Leotiomycetes